is a Japanese former backstroke swimmer. He competed in two events at the 1960 Summer Olympics.

References

External links
 

1938 births
Living people
Japanese male backstroke swimmers
Olympic swimmers of Japan
Swimmers at the 1960 Summer Olympics
Sportspeople from Tokyo
Asian Games medalists in swimming
Asian Games silver medalists for Japan
Swimmers at the 1958 Asian Games
Medalists at the 1958 Asian Games
20th-century Japanese people